Cloverdale, Oregon may refer to:

Cloverdale, Oregon (census-designated place in Tillamook County)
Cloverdale, Deschutes County, Oregon (unincorporated community)
Cloverdale, Lane County, Oregon (unincorporated community)